Wanlockhead railway station was opened on 1 October 1902 as the terminus on the Leadhills and Wanlockhead Light Railway and served the lead mining area, farms and the village of Wanlockhead. Elvanfoot railway station in South Lanarkshire was the junction for the branch and was located on the west coast main line. It remained open until 2 January 1939 for passengers and freight.

History
Operated by the Caledonian Railway, it became part of the London, Midland and Scottish Railway during the Grouping of 1923. The line had been closed and lifted before the Scottish Region of British Railways came into existence upon nationalisation in 1948. The line suffered greatly from the closure of the lead mines and passenger traffic was slight, although the station was located near to the small village of Wanlockhead.

To save money, the platform was only slightly raised at Wanlockhead. It was demarcated by a wooden fence. Carriages were fitted with three levels step board which folded down to enable passengers to alight and board at the station.

The station had a  passing loop, a single siding served a loading bank and a goods shed.  The waiting room, stationmaster's office, ticket office and men's toilet were located in a wooden lean-to building built along the long side of the goods shed. No signals were present, however a telephone was provided. The points were worked manually by the train crews as there wasn't a signal box. In 1916 a new siding was installed at the north side of the line. 

The line officially closed to all traffic on 2 January 1939. By April 1939, the track had been lifted and all buildings at the station demolished.

Reuse

The Leadhills and Wanlockhead Railway narrow gauge line and station are to be extended from Glengonnar Halt towards the site of the old station and its trackbed in the near future (datum 2019).

References

Notes

Sources 
 
 Ireland, Alastair (2011). The Leadhills and Wanlockhead Railway. Kelso : Alastair Ireland .
 Thomas, J. (1971). Scotland: the lowlands and borders. A regional history of the railways V.6. Newton Abbot.
 Wham, Alasdair (2017). Exploring Dumfries & Galloway's Lost Railway Heritage. A Walker's Guide. Catrine : Oakwood Press .
 Wignall, C.J. (1983). Complete British Railways Maps and Gazetteer From 1830-1981. Oxford : Oxford Publishing Co. .

External links
 Leadhills station on the Leadhills & Wanlockhead Railway.

Railway stations in Great Britain opened in 1902
Railway stations in Great Britain closed in 1939
Former Caledonian Railway stations